The Pennington House is a historic house at 317 Johnson Street in Clarksville, Arkansas.  It is a -story wood-frame structure, with a complex cross-gabled plan, weatherboard siding, and a stuccoed brick foundation.  It has an eclectic blend of Italianate and Folk Victorian features, including paired brackets in its eaves, moulded hoods over its sash windows, and a decorated porch.  The house was built in 1888-89 by B.D. Pennington.

The house was listed on the National Register of Historic Places in 1994.

See also
National Register of Historic Places listings in Johnson County, Arkansas

References

Houses on the National Register of Historic Places in Arkansas
National Register of Historic Places in Johnson County, Arkansas
Italianate architecture in Arkansas
Houses completed in 1888
Houses in Johnson County, Arkansas